Liu Xiaohui (born 5 August 1989) is a road cyclist from China. In 2012, she won the Tour of Zhoushan Island II.

References

External links
 profile at Procyclingstats.com

1989 births
Chinese female cyclists
Living people
Place of birth missing (living people)